Mylothris, commonly called dotted borders, is a genus of pierid butterflies found in Africa.

Species
Listed alphabetically within groups:

The chloris species group:
 Mylothris agathina (Cramer, [1779]) – eastern dotted border or common dotted border
 Mylothris arabicus Gabriel, 1954
 Mylothris asphodelus Butler, 1888
 Mylothris chloris (Fabricius, 1775) – western dotted border or common dotted border
 Mylothris continua Aurivillius, 1910
 Mylothris poppea (Cramer, [1777])
 Mylothris rhodope (Fabricius, 1775) – tropical dotted border or Rhodope

The trimenia species group:
 Mylothris croceus Butler, 1896
 Mylothris smithii (Mabille, 1879)
 Mylothris splendens Le Cerf, 1927
 Mylothris trimenia Butler, 1869 – Trimen's dotted border

The sagala species group:
 Mylothris jacksoni Sharpe, 1891 – Jackson's dotted border 
 Mylothris sagala Grose-Smith, 1886 – dusky dotted border

The bernice species group:
 Mylothris bernice (Hewitson, [1866])
 Mylothris carcassoni van Son, 1948

Ungrouped:
 Mylothris aburi Larsen & Collins, 2003
 Mylothris alberici Dufrane, 1940
 Mylothris alcuana Grünberg, 1910
 Mylothris atewa Berger, 1980 – Atewa dotted border
 Mylothris basalis Aurivillius, 1906
 Mylothris celisi Berger, 1981
 Mylothris citrina Aurivillius, 1898
 Mylothris crawshayi Butler, 1896
 Mylothris dimidiata Aurivillius, 1898
 Mylothris ducarmei Hecq, 2001
 Mylothris elodina Talbot, 1944
 Mylothris erlangeri Pagenstecher, 1902
 Mylothris ertli Suffert, 1904
 Mylothris eximia Hecq, 2005
 Mylothris flaviana Grose-Smith, 1898
 Mylothris hilara (Karsch, 1892)
 Mylothris humbloti (Oberthür, 1888)
 Mylothris jaopura Karsch, 1893
 Mylothris kahusiana Hecq, 2001
 Mylothris kiellandi Berger, 1985
 Mylothris kilimensis Kielland, 1990
 Mylothris kiwuensis Grünberg, 1910
 Mylothris knoopi Hecq, 2005
 Mylothris leonora Krüger, 1928
 Mylothris lucens Hecq, 2005
 Mylothris mafuga Berger, 1981
 Mylothris mavunda Hancock & Heath, 1985
 Mylothris mortoni Blachier, 1912
 Mylothris ngaziya Oberthür, 1888
 Mylothris nubila (Möschler, 1884)
 Mylothris ochracea Aurivillius, 1895
 Mylothris ochrea Berger, 1981
 Mylothris phileris (Boisduval, 1833)
 Mylothris pluviata Berger, 1980
 Mylothris polychroma Berger, 1981
 Mylothris primulina Butler, 1897
 Mylothris rembina (Plötz, 1880)
 Mylothris ruandana Strand, 1909
 Mylothris rubricosta Mabille, 1890
 Mylothris rueppellii (Koch, 1865) – Rüppell's dotted border or twin dotted border
 Mylothris schoutedeni Berger, 1952
 Mylothris schumanni Suffert, 1904
 Mylothris similis Lathy, 1906
 Mylothris sjostedti Aurivillius, 1895
 Mylothris spica (Möschler, 1884)
 Mylothris subsolana Hecq, 2001
 Mylothris sulphurea Aurivillius, 1895
 Mylothris superbus Kielland, 1985
 Mylothris talboti Berger, 1980
 Mylothris yulei Butler, 1897 – Yule's dotted border

References

Seitz, A. Die Gross-Schmetterlinge der Erde 13: Die Afrikanischen Tagfalter. Plate XIII 10 et seq

Pierini
Pieridae genera
Taxa named by Jacob Hübner